Glaphyropoma spinosum is a species of pencil catfish found in the Chapada Diamantina, Município de Andaraí, Povoado de Igatu, Gruna dos Torras, Rio Paraguaçu drainage State of Bahia, Brazil.

References

Trichomycteridae
Catfish of South America
Freshwater fish of Brazil
Endemic fauna of Brazil
Taxa named by Maria Elina Bichuette
Taxa named by Mário Cesar Cardoso de Pinna
Taxa named by Eleonora Trajano
Fish described in 2008